Mishar (Cyrillics: Мишар) may refer to:

 Mišar (Мишар, Mishar), a town in Serbia
 Mishar (cartoonist), Malaysian cartoonist
 Mishar Tatars
 Mishar Yurt
 Mishar Tatar dialect

See also 
 Misar (disambiguation)
 Mischer (disambiguation)
 Misharin, a surname

Language and nationality disambiguation pages